Western culture is the heritage of social norms, ethical values, traditional customs, belief systems, political systems, artifacts and technologies that originated in or are associated with Europe.

The term may also refer to:
The Western world, or more archaically
the Greco-Roman world
The culture of Europe
Western philosophy, and more specifically
Values (Western philosophy)

In music
Western Culture (album) by Henry Cow

See also
Occident
History of Western civilization
Westernization
Atlanticism